

Events

January–March 
 January 1
 Fisk University, a historically black university, is established in Nashville, Tennessee.
 The last issue of the abolitionist magazine The Liberator is published.
 January 6 – Ottoman troops clash with supporters of Maronite leader Youssef Bey Karam, at St. Doumit in Lebanon; the Ottomans are defeated.
 January 12
 The Royal Aeronautical Society is formed as The Aeronautical Society of Great Britain in London, the world's oldest such society.
 British auxiliary steamer  sinks in a storm in the Bay of Biscay, on passage from the Thames to Australia, with the loss of 244 people, and only 19 survivors.
 January 18 – Wesley College, Melbourne, is established.
 January 26 – Volcanic eruption in the Santorini caldera begins.
 February 7 – Battle of Abtao: A Spanish naval squadron fights a combined Peruvian-Chilean fleet, at the island of Abtao, in the Chiloé Archipelago of southern Chile.
 February 13 – The first daylight bank robbery in United States history during peacetime takes place in Liberty, Missouri. This is considered to be the first robbery committed by Jesse James and his gang, although James's role is disputed.
 February 26 – The Calaveras Skull is discovered in California. Purported to be evidence of humans in North America during the Pliocene epoch, it turns out to be a hoax.
 February 28 – The month concludes without having a full moon.
 March 13 – The United States Congress overwhelmingly passes the Civil Rights Act of 1866, the first federal legislation to protect the rights of African-Americans; U.S. President Andrew Johnson vetoes the bill on March 27, and Congress overrides the veto on April 9.
 March 31 – A total lunar eclipse occurs.

April–June 
 April 4 – Alexander II of Russia narrowly escapes an assassination attempt in the city of St Petersburg.
 April 8 – The kingdoms of Italy and Prussia form an alliance against the Austrian Empire.
 April 10 – The American Society for the Prevention of Cruelty to Animals (ASPCA) is founded in New York City by Henry Bergh.
 May 2 – Battle of Callao: Peruvian defenders fight the Spanish fleet.
 May 7 – Student Ferdinand Cohen-Blind makes a failed attempt to assassinate Otto von Bismarck in Unter den Linden in Berlin.

 May 10 – London bank Overend, Gurney and Company collapses, precipitating Panic of 1866.
 May 16 – The United States Congress approves the minting of a nickel 5-cent coin (nickel), eliminating its predecessor, the half dime.
 May 24 – Battle of Tuyutí: 32,000 soldiers of the Triple Alliance defeat 24,000 Paraguayan soldiers few miles north of the Paraná, Argentina, in the Paraguayan War, with 16,000 casualties.
 May 26 – First production of the comic opera Cox and Box by F. C. Burnand and Arthur Sullivan at Moray Lodge, Kensington
 May 30 – Bedrich Smetana's comic opera The Bartered Bride premiered in Prague.
 June 2 – Fenian forces skirmish with Canadian militia at the battles of Ridgeway and Fort Erie.
 June 5 – Calculations indicate Pluto (not known at this time) reaches its only aphelion (furthest point from the Sun) between 1618 and August 2113.
 June 8 – The Parliament of Canada meets for the first time in Ottawa.
 June 11 – The Agra High Court is established (later shifted to the Allahabad High Court).
 June 14 – The Austro-Prussian War begins when the Austrians and most of the medium German states declare war on Prussia.
 June 20 – The Kingdom of Italy declares war on Austria.
 June 22 – In Sweden, the Riksdag of the Estates votes to replace itself by an elected two-chamber Riksdag.
 June 27–29 – Battle of Langensalza: The Prussians defeat the Hanoverian army.

July–September 
 July 3 – Battle of Königgrätz: the Prussian army under King Wilhelm and Helmuth von Moltke defeats the Austrian army of Ludwig von Benedek, leading to a decisive Prussian victory in the Austro-Prussian War.
 July 5 – Princess Helena, third daughter of Queen Victoria, marries Prince Christian of Schleswig-Holstein.
 July 10 – Reconstruction Treaty with Choctaw & Chickasaw, completing the abolition of slavery in the United States; see also Choctaw freedmen.
 July 13 (July 1 Old Style) – The first Constitution of Romania is issued.
 July 20 – Naval Battle of Lissa: The Austrian fleet under Wilhelm von Tegetthoff defeats the Italian fleet of Carlo di Persano.
 July 24 – Reconstruction: Tennessee becomes the first U.S. state to be readmitted to the Union following the American Civil War.
 July 25 – The United States Congress passes legislation authorizing the four-star rank of General of the Army (later reestablished as a five-star rank); Lieutenant General Ulysses S. Grant becomes the first to have this rank.

 July 27 – The  successfully completes laying the transatlantic telegraph cable between Valentia Island, Ireland, and Heart's Content, Newfoundland, permanently restoring a communications link.
 July 28 – The Metric Act of 1866 becomes law and legalizes the standardization of weights and measures in the United States.
 August 23 – The Treaty of Prague ends the Austro-Prussian War. The Duchy of Limburg leaves the German Confederation.
 September – The Great Tea Race of 1866 ends in London, narrowly won by the clipper ship Taeping.
 September 22 – Paraguay successfully defends Curupayty against the Triple Alliance in the Paraguayan War, killing more than 5,000 while sustaining just about 50 casualties.

October–December 

 October 12 – The Treaty of Vienna ends the war between Austria and Italy; it formalizes the annexation of Venetia by Italy.
 October 14 – French troops under the command of Rear Admiral Pierre-Gustave Roze land at Ganghwa Island, Korea, as part of a punitive expedition against that kingdom for the execution of French Jesuit priests. It is the first military contact between Korea and a Western force.
 October 22 – The office of State President of the South African Republic is created by constitutional amendment approved at a session of the Volksraad.
 November 7 – The Ruse–Varna railway line (the first railway in Bulgaria) officially opens.
 December 12– Oaks explosion: The worst mining disaster in England kills 383 miners and rescuers.
 December 18 – The College of Wooster is founded in Ohio.

Date unknown 
 Federalist revolts occur in Argentina.
 Alfred Nobel invents dynamite in Germany.
 Foundation of the predecessors of Nestlé S.A., the Anglo-Swiss Milk Company and Farine Lactée Henri Nestlé.
 The Minneapolis Milling Company, predecessor of General Mills, builds its own mills.
 Marcus Jastrow arrives in the United States to become rabbi of Congregation Rodeph Shalom in Philadelphia.
 The recommendations of the state Girls' School Committee of 1866 result in a series of progressive reforms in women's rights in Sweden.
 The Famine of 1866–68 begins in Finland.
 Erasmus Jacobs discovers the  Eureka Diamond near Hopetown on the banks of the Orange River in the Cape of Good Hope.
 Magirus Kommamditist, as predecessor of a major worldwide commercial vehicles manufacturing brand, Iveco, is founded in Baden-Württemberg, Germany.

Births

January–March 

 January 13
 George Gurdjieff, Russian spiritual teacher (d. 1949)
 Vasily Kalinnikov, Russian composer (d. 1901)
 January 15
 Nathan Söderblom, Swedish archbishop, recipient of the Nobel Peace Prize (d. 1931)
 Horatio Dresser, American New Thought religious leader and writer (d. 1954)
 January 16 – Percy Pilcher, English inventor and pioneer aviator (d. 1899)
 January 19 – Harry Davenport, American actor (d. 1949)
 January 29 
 Romain Rolland, French writer, Nobel Prize laureate (d. 1944)
 Frank Tudor, Australian politician (d. 1922)
 February 1 – Agda Meyerson, Swedish nurse and healthcare profession activist (d. 1924)
 February 2 – Enrique Simonet, Spanish painter (d. 1927)
 February 9 – George Ade, American writer, newspaper columnist and playwright (d. 1944)
 February 18 – Janko Vukotić, Montenegrin general (d. 1927)
 February 26 – Herbert Henry Dow, Canadian chemical industrialist (d. 1930)
 March 5 – Arthur Leopold Busch, English-born American submarine pioneer (d. 1956)
 March 7 – Hans Fruhstorfer, German lepidopterist (d. 1922)
 March 15 – Matthew Charlton, Australian politician (d. 1948)
 March 19 – Emilio De Bono, Italian general and fascist activist (d. 1944)
 March 21 – James Harbord, American general (d. 1947)

April–June 

 April 1 – Ferruccio Busoni, Italian pianist and composer (d. 1924)
 April 3 – J. B. M. Hertzog, Boer General and 3rd Prime Minister of South Africa (d. 1942)
 April 8 – Alfred Allen, American actor (d. 1947)
 April 13 – Butch Cassidy, American outlaw (k. 1908)
 April 14 – Anne Sullivan, American tutor of Helen Keller (d. 1936)
 April 17 – Ernest Starling, English physiologist (d. 1927)
 April 21 – Josefa Toledo de Aguerri, Nicaraguan pioneer educator (d. 1962)
 April 22 – Hans von Seeckt, German general (d. 1936)
 April 24 – Ishii Kikujirō, Japanese diplomat (d. 1945)
 May 10 – Richard H. Jackson, American four-star admiral (d. 1971)
 May 17 – Erik Satie, French composer (d. 1925)
 May 22 – Charles F. Haanel, American New Thought author and businessman (d. 1949)
 June 4 – Miina Sillanpää, Finnish politician (d. 1952)
 June 26 
 George Herbert, 5th Earl of Carnarvon, English financier of Egyptian excavations (d. 1923)
 Josef Swickard, German actor (d. 1940)

July–September 

 July 6 – Charles Mangin, French general (d. 1925)
 July 9 – Macklyn Arbuckle, American actor (d. 1931)
 July 13 – La Goulue, French dancer (d. 1929)
 July 25 – Frederick Blackman, English plant physiologist (d. 1947)
 July 27 – António José de Almeida, 6th President of Portugal and 64th Prime Minister of Portugal (d. 1929)
 July 28 – Beatrix Potter, English children's author (Peter Rabbit and Jemima Puddle-Duck) (d. 1943)
 August 2 – Adrien de Gerlache, Belgian naval officer and explorer (d. 1934)
 August 4 – Gheorghe Mărdărescu, Romanian general and politician (d. 1938)
 August 6 – Chief Thunderbird, Native American actor (d. 1946)
 August 8 – Matthew Henson, African-American explorer (d. 1955)
 August 12 – Jacinto Benavente, Spanish writer, Nobel Prize laureate (d. 1954)
 August 14 – Dmitry Merezhkovsky, Russian novelist, poet and religious thinker (d. 1941)
 September 1
 James J. Corbett, American boxer (d. 1933)
 Thomas F. Woodlock, editor of The Wall Street Journal and Interstate Commerce Commission commissioner (d. 1945)
 September 7 – Tristan Bernard, French writer (d. 1947)
 September 10 – Jeppe Aakjær, Danish poet and novelist (d. 1930)
 September 16 – Joe Vila, American sportswriter (d. 1934)
 September 21
 Charles Nicolle, French bacteriologist, recipient of the Nobel Prize in Physiology or Medicine (d. 1936)
 H. G. Wells, English writer (d. 1946)
 September 22 – Witmer Stone, American ornithologist and botanist (d. 1939)
 September 27 – Eurosia Fabris, Italian Catholic Blessed (d. 1932)
 September 25 – Thomas Hunt Morgan, American geneticist, recipient of the Nobel Prize in Physiology or Medicine (d. 1945)

October–December 

 October 6 
 Reginald Fessenden, Canadian inventor (d. 1932)
 Nina Bang, Danish politician (d. 1928)
 October 12 – Ramsay MacDonald, Scottish Prime Minister of the United Kingdom (d. 1937)
 October 29 – Antonio Luna, Filipino general (d. 1899)
 November 3 – Paul Lincke, German composer (d. 1946)
 November 11 – Martha Annie Whiteley, English chemist and mathematician (d. 1956)
 November 12 – Sun Yat-sen, Chinese revolutionary (d. 1925)
 November 16 – Cornelia Sorabji, Indian-born lawyer (d. 1954)
 November 28 
 Sy Sanborn, American sportswriter (d. 1934)
 David Warfield, American stage actor (d. 1951)
 November 30
 Robert Broom, Scottish paleontologist (d. 1951)
 Andrey Lyapchev, 22nd Prime Minister of Bulgaria (d. 1933)
 December 2 – Constantin Cristescu, Romanian general (d. 1923)
 December 11 - Ada Baker, Australian soprano, singing teacher and vaudeville star (d. 1949)
 December 12 – Alfred Werner, German chemist, Nobel Prize laureate (d. 1919)
 December 16 (December 4 O.S.) – Wassily Kandinsky, Russian-born painter (d. 1944)
 December 17 – Kazys Grinius, 5th Prime Minister of Lithuania (d. 1950)
 December 29 – Marie Cahill, American singer and actress (d. 1933)

Date unknown 
 William M. Dalton, American Old West outlaw (d. 1894)

Deaths

January–June 
 January (date unknown) – Thomas Baldwin Marsh, American religious leader (b. 1799)
 January 16 – Phineas Quimby, American physician (b. 1802)
 January 19 – Harriet Ludlow Clarke, British artist
 January 23 – Thomas Love Peacock, English satirist (b. 1785)
 January 31 – Friedrich Rückert, German poet, translator and professor of Oriental languages (b. 1788)
 February 25 – Sarah Ann Gill, Barbadian national heroine (b. 1795)
 March 4 – Alexander Campbell, Irish/U.S. founder of the Disciples of Christ (b. 1788)
 March 6 – William Whewell, English scientist, philosopher and historian of science (b. 1794)
 March 20 – Rikard Nordraak, Norwegian composer (b. 1842)
 March 21 – Nadezhda Durova, first female Russian military officer (b. 1783)
 March 24 – Maria Amalia of Naples and Sicily, Queen of France (b. 1782)
 March 28 – Solomon Foot, American politician (b. 1802)
 March 29 – John Keble, British churchman (b. 1792)
 April 1 – Elizabeth Jesser Reid, English social reformer, founder of Bedford College (b. 1789)
 April 4  – William Dick, founder of Edinburgh Veterinary College (b. 1793)
 April 5 – Thomas Hodgkin, British physician (b. 1798)
 April 7 – Johann Sedlatzek, German flautist (b. 1789)
 April 12 – Peter Hesketh-Fleetwood, English Member of Parliament and developer (b. 1801)
 May 13 – Nikolai Brashman, Russian mathematician of Czech origin (b. 1796)
 May 29 – Winfield Scott, American general and presidential candidate (b. 1786)
 June 7 – Chief Sealth, Native American for whom Seattle is named (b. c. 1786)
 June 17 – Lewis Cass, American military officer, politician, and statesman (b. 1782)

July–December 

 July 20 – Bernhard Riemann, German mathematician (b. 1826)
 July 25 – Floride Calhoun, Second Lady of the United States (b. 1792)
 July 29 – Madame Clicquot Ponsardin, French champagne producer  (b. 1777) 
 August 1 – John Ross, long-serving principal chief of the Cherokee Nation, of natural causes, in Washington D. C. (born 1790 in Cherokee Nation East).
 August 6 – Christian Eric Fahlcrantz, Swedish writer (b. 1790)
 August 20 – Maria De Mattias, Italian Catholic saint (b. 1805)
 August 29 – Tokugawa Iemochi, 14th shōgun of the Tokugawa shogunate of Japan (b. 1846)
 September 4 – Theresa Pulszky, European author (b. 1819)
 September 30 – Per Gustaf Svinhufvud af Qvalstad, Swedo-Finnish treasurer of Tavastia province, manor host, and paternal grandfather of President P. E. Svinhufvud (b. 1804)
 October 13 – Celadon Leeds Daboll, American merchant and inventor (b. 1818)
 October 18 – Manuel Bulnes, Chilean general and politician, President of Chile (b. 1799)
 November 11 – Agustín Jerónimo de Iturbide y Huarte, Prince Imperial of Mexico (b. 1807)
 November 14 – King Miguel I of Portugal (b. 1802)
 November 26 – Jean-Jacques Willmar, Luxembourg politician (b. 1792)
 December 1 – George Everest, Welsh geodesist (b. 1790)
 December 21 – William J. Fetterman, United States Army officer (b. 1835?)
 December 21 – Mercedes Marín del Solar, Chilean poet, reform educator (b. 1804)

Date unknown
Du Bois Agett, early settler of Western Australia (b. 1796)

References